Bel Assis is Mo Foster's first album. He produced all the tracks, with engineering and mixing by Simon Smart.

Bel Assis was originally released on Pete Van Hooke's fledgling MMC record label in 1988 and was subsequently remastered and re-released in 2003 by Angel Air Records.

Track listing
 "The Light In Your Eyes" – 5:42
 "A Walk In The Country" – 4:31
 "Gaia" – 6:27
 "Crete Revisited" – 4:44
 "So Far Away" – 3:47
 "Analytical Engine" – 5:01
 "Pump II" – 6:05
 "Jaco" – 6:11
 "Bel Assis" – 3:43
 "And Then There Were Ten" – 5:01
 "Nomad" – 8:10

All tracks were written by Foster, with the exception of tracks 5 and 10 which were written by Foster and Ray Russell.

Personnel
 Mo Foster – Basses, Keyboards
 Simon Phillips – Drums
 Gary Moore – Guitar
 Stan Sulzman – Soprano Sax
 Ray Russell – Guitars
 Frank Ricotti – Vibraphone
 Peter Van Hooke – Electronic Percussion
 Rod Argent – Keyboards
 Dave Defries – Trumpet
 Sal Gallina – Electronic Wind Instruments

Technical details
The album was recorded on 24 track analogue at 30ips without noise reduction. It was mixed to 2-track analogue using Dolby SR. It was mastered to the 1610 format and PQ edited at EMI's Abbey Road Studio

It was recorded between October 1987 and January 1988 at several studios:
 Last Chance Recordings, London, England
 The White House Studio, Suffolk, England
 The Red House Studio, Bedfordshire, England
 Eastcote Studio, London, England
 Windmill Lane Studios, Dublin, Ireland

Additional technical staff
Additional engineers:
 Richard Dodd
 Norman Goodman
 Graham Lyons
 Neil Richmond
 Keiron Wheeler
 Pat McCarthy
 Fran Kelly

1988 debut albums
Mo Foster albums